Adriaan Hermanus Diedericks (born 1 November 1990, Cape Town, South Africa) is a South African artist. He is known. for his contemporary bronze sculptures.

Career 
After graduating with a fine arts degree from Stellenbosch University in 2012, he apprenticed with Lionel Smit from 2013-2014. Diedericks was a SASOL New Signatures Finalist in 2010 and 2014 and a PPC YCSA Finalist in 2013. In 2014, Diedericks was invited to take part in Art Fair Strasbourg and Cologne.

He has been featured in numerous publications including SA Art Times, Top Billing, Effe O' Arte, Visi, Die Burger, Country Life, Ubi Bene and SLOW Magazine.

Diedericks opened a bronze casting foundry in 2016 in Strand, South Africa.

In 2017, Diedericks attended the 4th International Artist Symposium along with 9 other artists from around the world at Museum Villa Böhm in Germany where he worked with sandstone for the first time.

Diedericks placed large public sculptures in Stellenbosch, Hermanus, Franschhoek and Rhineland-Palatinate, Germany

Style 
Diedericks' work reflects the sculptural forms of Ancient Greece, with contemporary refinement. Drawing on Classical, African and European mythology, Diedericks incorporates imagery of men, horses and ships. Many of his works are inspired by Michel Foucault's Theory of Power and the dialectic of Hegel's master and servant.

Selected exhibitions

2018 
 Cape Town Art Fair, L99P Gallery, Cape Town

2017 
 Perceptive Resonance, Solo Exhibition, Art in the Yard Gallery
 Christened Ships, L99p Gallery. Cape Town.
 Cape Town Art Fair, L99P Gallery, Cape Town

2016 
 Travelling Body, Solo Exhibition, Rust and Vrede Gallery, Cape Town
 Turbine Art Fair, Lizamore & Associates

2015 
 Seraph, Solo Exhibition, Jan Royce Gallery, Cape Town
 Binne Buiteland. Gallery on Leviseur, Bloemfontein
 As is, so was, Solo Exhibition, Grande Provence, Franschhoek

2014 
 ST-ART, Strasbourg Art Fair, L'Art Industriel, Strasbourg
 Art Cologne, L'Art Industriel, Cologne

Selected collections 
 Ellerman Contemporary
 Quoin Rock Wine Estate
 Cavalli Wine & Stud Estate
 Holbar AG Liechtenstein
 PPC Private Collection
 Modern Art Projects Collection, Richmond
 Association of Arts Pretoria
 MXIT Private Collection
 Bartinney Wine Estate

References

1990 births
Living people
Stellenbosch University alumni
21st-century South African sculptors
Artists from Cape Town